De la Reyweg is a RandstadRail stop in Den Haag, the Netherlands.

History 

The station is a stop for lines 2 and 4 and is on the Loosduinseweg. Line 12 stops nearby on the De la Reyweg. Passengers should change between lines 2 and 4 here.

RandstadRail services 
The following services currently call at De la Reyweg:

Tram Services

Connecting Tram Service

Gallery

References

RandstadRail stations in The Hague